Lycenchelys muraena, the moray wolf eel, is a species of marine ray-finned fish belonging to the family Zoarcidae, the eelpouts. It is found in the Arctic and North Atlantic Oceans.

Taxonomy
In 1920 David Starr Jordan designated this Lycodes muraena as the type species of the genus Lycenchelys, which had been proposed by Theodore Gill in 1884 but which Gill had not given a type species for. The specific name is the Scientific name for moray eel and is a reference to the slender, eel-shaped body of this species.

Description
Lycenchelys muraena has a very elongate body which has a depth at the origin of the anal fin which is around 1/20th of its total length. The body is covered in scales apart from the forward are of chest and on the back in front of the dorsal fin. The origin of the dorsal fin origin is over the centre of  the pectoral fin, the pectoral fin has a length equivalent to 8% of the total length while the distance from the snout to the anus is around 26% t 30% of the total length. There is a double lateral line, with a frequently indistinct midlateral line and they branch ventrally. The colour is a uniform dark brownish.

Distribution, habitat and biology
It feeds on small crustaceans.

References

muraena
Fish described in 1878